Barry Habib (born January 15, 1960) is an American entrepreneur, bestselling author, and the recipient of three Crystal Ball Awards for the accuracy of his real estate market forecasts.

While known for his contributions to the housing industry and financial forecasting, Habib also achieved success in the entertainment industry as lead producer of Rock of Ages - the 27th longest running show in Broadway history - and was turned into a major motion picture. Additional producing credits include Criss Angel's "Mindfreak" at Planet Hollywood in Vegas.

His Amazon #1 bestselling book, Money in the Streets is a never-ending testament of how overpowering negative forces lead to living our greatest potential. In the words of Tony Robbins, "Barry has taught and inspired many people as a speaker, and now in his new book, he's able to reach and positively influence the lives of many more."

As an innovator, Habib has bought and sold several successful businesses including Mortgage Market Guide, CPMS, Certified Mortgage Associates, and Healthcare Imaging Solutions and was a founding partner in Experience.com.

Identifying an industry in need, Barry's current focus is MBS Highway, which he founded in 2012 with the vision of interpreting and forecasting activity in the mortgage rate and bond markets. His insights are so highly regarded that he appears regularly on Fox Business Network Fox Business Network and CNBC Networks, followed by thousands of mortgage professionals. His Monthly Mortgage Report show ran for 13 years on Squawk Box. Consistently recognized by his peers, he was named the St. Armand Ventures 2021 Businessman of the Year, appeared on the Mortgage Global 100 List, and secured a place on the 100 People to Watch in 2023.

Early career
Habib began his career as a loan originator in 1986 and founded Certified Mortgage Associates in 1989, a mortgage provider in Monmouth County, NJ. Barry was recognized as the nation's top mortgage loan originator in 1992.  During his career, Barry closed over $2 billion in personal production.  

Later, Barry was hired as a National Sales Trainer by two mortgage companies, CTX and GMAC. Habib remained a loan originator until 2007.

Mortgage resources
Habib founded The Mortgage Market Guide in 2001, a product designed to help loan originators to more accurately anticipate market trends through analysis of industry, the bond market, and Japanese Candlestick Charts, a 300-year-old market indicator. United Communications Group (UCG), a provider of business information, tools and guidance for two million professionals worldwide acquired MMG in 2006.

In 2008, he merged The Mortgage Market Guide with two other mortgage industry information providers –  Loan Tool Box and The Duncan Group to act as Chairman of the Board of Mortgage Success Source (MSS). Habib founded and created CMPS (Certified Mortgage Planning Specialist) in 2005 and transferred his interest in 2007.

In 2012 Barry founded MBS Highway to provide support for loan originators and real estate professionals through their website. His Certified Mortgage Advisor (CMA) course is renowned for elevating the level of professionalism and mortgage knowledge in the industry.

Additional experience
Habib works as a professional speaker on financial markets, housing, negotiation, technical trading analysis, sales training, building relationships and motivation. He has managed a hedge fund, authored a stock advisory newsletter, owned an insurance agency, and acted as managing partner in a real estate investment company.

Barry has been the highest rated speaker and trainer in mortgage and real estate for over 25 years and is widely credited with saving the mortgage industry in 2020 from margin calls due to Fed actions. His presentation to the Fed created stability at a critical time.

Entertainment industry career
Habib was the largest investor in Rock of Ages – a musical theatre production running on Broadway and Internationally. The show received five 2009 Tony Award nominations, including Best Musical and Best Performance by a Lead Actor in a Musical, and an Outer Critics Circle Nomination and Drama League Nomination.

He had an acting role and executive producer credit in four films released between 2009-2013.

Sympathy for Delicious
Barry Munday
Nic & Tristan
Lonely Street
Rock of Ages (2012 film)

Awards and Achievements
 2017 - Zillow and Pulsenomics Crystal Ball Award for the most accurate real estate forecaster
 2019 - Zillow and Pulsenomics Crystal Ball Award for the most accurate real estate forecaster
 2019 - National Mortgage Professional Magazine's Mortgage Professional of the year
 2020 - Zillow and Pulsenomics Crystal Ball Award for the most accurate real estate forecaster
 2021 - The St. Armand Ventures Businessman of the Year Award
 2021 - Mortgage Global 100 List
 2022 - Named to the list of 100 People to Watch in 2023
 Finalist for the Ernst & Young Entrepreneur of the Year

Published works
Barry's #1 Amazon bestselling book, Money in the Streets, is more than one man’s journey in hard-knocks New York. It’s more than the recounting of risking it all to win. Told with heart and laced with the sentiment of tremendous gratitude, Barry Habib deftly weaves tales of his upbringing to take the reader back in time. 

Of particular note are the mindset tactics in Money in the Streets that are road-tested and personal practices of Habib, who treats each day as a reason to be thankful. No matter the struggle, whether self-doubt, negativity, loss, stress, or being “stuck” in life, Money in the Streets is a resolution roadmap. An easy read that will play on the reader’s every emotion, this standout work and Habib’s voice are unforgettable. He writes as if you are the only person in the room…because to Habib, you are.

Family
Habib is currently a resident of New Jersey. Habib and his ex-wife Toni (née Toni Billand) divorced in 2016. Habib has four children: Dan, Nicole, Jake and Jared.

He is a music enthusiast, and currently sings in The Rock Of Ages Band with Constantine Maroulis.

References

6. Barry Habib Named Two-Time Winner of Crystal Ball Award. National Mortgage Professional. February 6, 2020.

External links

Rock of Ages

American financial businesspeople
1960 births
Living people